Mafikeng Community Radio 96.7 is a South African community radio station based in the North West.

Coverage areas 
Radius of 100 km centered on Mafikeng:  
Mafikeng
Setlaole
Madibogo
Gelukspan
Kopela
Ramatlabama
Itsoseng
Lichtenburg
Tshidilamolomo

Broadcast languages
Tswana
English

Broadcast time
24/7

Target audience
Community
LSM Groups 2 - 9

Listenership Figures

References

External links
 Official Website
 SAARF Website

Community radio stations in South Africa
Mass media in North West (South African province)